Parents is a 2016 Danish drama film directed by Christian Tafdrup. Søren Malling won a Robert Award for Best Actor in a Leading Role for his role as Kjeld.

Premise 
When their son Esben moves away from home, Kjeld and Vibeke decide to move to something smaller. They discover that their old apartment is for sale and move back to start fresh. Kjeld decorates the apartment as it once looked, and together they relive their youthful days in love. But what once defined them may no longer exist, and one morning events take a turn neither of them could have predicted as they wake up thirty years younger.

Cast 
 Bodil Jørgensen as Vibeke
 Søren Malling as Kjeld
  as Vibeke
 Emilia Imperatore Bjørnvad as Sandra
 Anton Honik as Esben
 Elliott Crosset Hove as Kjeld

References

External links 
 
 

2016 drama films
Danish drama films
2010s Danish-language films